Tarhan is a Turkish origin name which is used as a surname and a masculine given name. People with the name include:

Surname
 Abdülhak Hâmid Tarhan (1852–1937), Turkish playwright and poet
 Ali Rana Tarhan (1883–1956), Turkish politician
 Bilge Tarhan (footballer) (1941–2016), Turkish football player
 Bilge Tarhan (gymnast) (born 2004), Turkish artistic gymnast
 Candan Tarhan (1942–1989), Turkish football manager
 Çınar Tarhan (born 1997), Turkish football player
 Emine Ülker Tarhan (born 1963), Turkish jurist and politician
 Furkan Tarhan (born 1980), Turkish businessman
 İhsan Yıldırım Tarhan (born 1980), Turkish boxer
 Mehmet Tarhan (born 1978), Turkish activist
 Mehmet Hayri Tarhan (1884–1934), Ottoman Turkish military officer
 Melike Tarhan (born 1978), Belgian-Turkish music artist
 Mümtaz Tarhan (1908–1970), Turkish politician
 Nevzat Tarhan (born 1952), Turkish psychiatrist

Given name
 Tarhan Erdem (1933–2022), Turkish politician

See also
 Tarhan, disambiguation page

Surnames of Turkish origin
Turkish masculine given names